Mette Henriette Martedatter Rølvåg is a performing artist, saxophonist and composer from Norway.

Background 
Mette Henriette grew up in Trondheim surrounded by a vibrant music scene and she got involved with performing arts at a young age, establishing her own ensembles and touring with musicians from jazz conservatories in Norway and New York, before she left her hometown to work on commissions and projects Internationally. Since then Mette Henriette has been living and working in New York, London, Paris, Svalbard and Oslo.

Career 
In 2016 Mette Henriette became the first artist to release a double debut album on the renowned jazz record label ECM Records. The album includes 90 minutes of music which she composed over a period of 10 years for her trio and large ensemble, consisting of jazz, classical and tango musicians. The record was produced in collaboration with Manfred Eicher and recorded in Rainbow Studio with sound engineer Jan Erik Kongshaug. The album cover and photo series were photographed by Anton Corbijn.

"It is seldom I find someone I don't know in the music world when that someone is one who surprises you with their talent and presence, and Mette is one of these people with that rare quality. She has an other worldly appearance, utterly fascinating."  — Anton Corbijn  

In addition to her work as a performer and composer, Mette Henriette develops scenography, lighting design and choreographic concepts for her works for stage and screen. She did cross-disciplinary projects with a variety of artists including Marina Abramovic, Manfred Eicher, Hege Haagenrud, Darkside, Radik Tyulyush, CocoRosie, Valgeir Sigurdsson and more."Mette Henriette is different" — Marina Abramovic

Selected works / Commissions 
 2017: Opening concert Saivu of Riddu Riddu for the 100th anniversary of the Sami rights meeting.
 2017: Solo performance In Between inside Athens Concert Hall at documenta14
 2017: Recorded theatre music with Valgeir Sigurdsson and CocoRosie for EDDA by Robert Wilson
 2017: Artist residency at Edvard Munch's ateliers in Ekely
 2017: Artist residency at Southbank Centre in London
 2017: Solo performance at the opening of Artica in Longyearbyen
 2016: Opening concert for Berlin Jazz Festival
 2016: Solo performance on a sacred Sami stone at Trænafestivalen 
 2015: Audiovisual installation for the abandoned island Vibrandsøy commissioned by Ultima and Concerts Norway
 2015: Duo performance with Marina Abramovic at The Hole curated by Anohni, CocoRosie, Kembra Pfahler
 2014: Performance art film Scream directed by Marina Abramovic

Discography 

2015: Mette Henriette (ECM Records)
2023: Drifting (ECM Records)

References

External links

21st-century Norwegian saxophonists
Avant-garde jazz musicians
Norwegian jazz saxophonists
Norwegian jazz composers
Norwegian Sámi musicians
Musicians from Trondheim
Living people
Year of birth missing (living people)
Women jazz saxophonists